Somner is a surname. Notable people with the surname include:

 Doug Somner (born 1951), Scottish footballer
 Matt Somner (born 1982), English footballer
 William Somner (1593–1669), English scholar

See also
 Sommer
 Sumner (surname)